Andy Chatterley (born 8 May 1973) is a British record producer and songwriter. He is also the CEO of online content protection company MUSO.

Life and career 
Chatterly was born in Jersey, Channel Islands. He attended Victoria College, Jersey. As a record producer and songwriter, he has worked with artists such as The Pussycat Dolls, Kanye West, Kylie Minogue, Diana Vickers, Rea Garvey, Melanie C, Nerina Pallot, Siobhan Fahey, Theoretical Girl and Bright Light Bright Light.

Chatterley co-wrote and produced the title track "Aphrodite" by Kylie Minogue, as well as the single "Better than Today" from the album, Aphrodite. Chatterley co-wrote "Put Your Hands Up" by Nerina Pallot the lead single from Year of the Wolf.

Chatterley co-wrote and produced all of Can't Stand The Silence by Rea Garvey and produced and co-wrote singles "Can't Stand The Silence", "Heart of an Enemy" and "Wild Love".and both follow up album platinum selling "Pride' and 'Prisma'

Chatterley worked as an off-screen coach on the television show The Voice of Germany for Rea Garvey's team, and an on screen coach for The Voice of Germany 2012, producing the finalists' singles in 2011 and 2012. He also produced the album Stay Who You Are for the winner of the 2012 edition Nick Howard, including the single "Unbreakable".

As a remixer and artist under various aliases including Yum Yum, Skylark, The Buick Project, The Droyds, and Edison, as well as his own name, he has remixed songs by Tracy Thorne, Muse, Blondie, Justice, Level 42, The Pussycat Dolls, Ladytron, Nerina Pallot, Tears for Fears, Deep Dish, Chia Pet, XPress 2, and Adam & The Ants.

He is the co-founder and director of an anti-piracy company that helps rightholders within the media industries protect their content online. He also owns a recording studio complex in North London. He was co-founder of Saved Records, which he started with DJ Nic Fanciulli in 2003. Previously, he had owned Sperm Records.

Personal life

On 14 February 2007, Chatterley married British singer Nerina Pallot in London, England. They have a son, Wolfgang Amadeus Chatterley, and live in the countryside .

References

Living people
1973 births
People educated at Victoria College, Jersey
British record producers
British songwriters